Neeper is an unincorporated community in Clark County, in the U.S. state of Missouri.

History
A post office called Neeper was established in 1875, and remained in operation until 1904. The community has the name of Dr. Samuel Neeper, an early settler.

References

Unincorporated communities in Clark County, Missouri
Unincorporated communities in Missouri